Mallersdorf Abbey (Abtei or Kloster Mallersdorf) was formerly a monastery of the Benedictine Order and is now a Franciscan convent in  Mallersdorf-Pfaffenberg in Bavaria.

History
The monastery, dedicated to Saint John the Evangelist, was founded in 1107 by Heinrich of Kirchberg, a ministerialis of Niedermünster in Regensburg, and settled by monks from either the monastery of Michelsberg in Bamberg or St. Emmeram's Abbey in Regensburg.

Under Abbot Eppo (1122-1143) the reforming influences of the monasteries of St. Georgen im Schwarzwald and of Hirsau had a significant impact. At this time the community was subordinated to Otto I, Bishop of Bamberg and placed under the direct protection of Pope Innocent II (1130-1143). In 1136 Abbot Eppo dissolved the double monastery (i.e., including both men and women) which seems to have been there until that time; the women's convent was transferred to nearby Eitting. In the 12th century there was church building in the romanesque style, in the 13th a period of spiritual awakening, and in the 14th the reforms led by Kastl Abbey. In the mid 16th century the abbey narrowly escaped dissolution. The monastic grammar school enjoyed an excellent reputation.

The abbey was finally dissolved in 1803 during the secularisation of Bavaria. The assets and estates were auctioned off. The monastery buildings were used from 1807 as offices for local officials.

Since 1869 Franciscan sisters have lived at the site, and presently run the "Special Academy for Social Pedagogy of the Poor Clares of Mallersdorf" ("Fachakademie für Sozialpädagogik der Armen Franziskanerinnen Mallersdorf"). There is also a Realschule there.

In August 2014, it was reported that Sister Doris Engelhard, a nun at the abbey and a certified master brewer, was the last beer making nun in Europe.  She has been brewing beer at the abbey for over 40 years.  Brewing at the abbey was revived in 1881. On brewing days, she is excused from morning prayers and starts work at the abbey brew house at 3:30 a.m. Depending on the season, Sister Doris will brew a maibock, a doppelbock, a dark zoigl, or a copper-hued vollbier (lager).

Benedictine abbots and administrators of Mallersdorf

 Burkard (1109-1122)
 Eppo of St. Georgen (1122-1143)
 Emicho (1143-1157)
 Otto (-1172)
 Heinrich I (1180, -1194)
 Adelhoch (1194-1206)
 Dietrich (1206-1226)
 Gerung
 Meinwart
 Ulrich I (-1261)
 Heinrich II (1261-1273)
 Benedikt I (-1279)
 Hermann I (1279-1286)
 Heinrich III (1286-1295)
 Berthold I Vilser (1295-1301)
 Rudiger (1301-1320)
 Bernhard (1320-1327)
 Ulrich II Hintzheimer (1327-1352)
 Konrad von Ellenbach (1353-1356)
 Hermann II (1356-1370)
 Berthold II (1370-1380)
 Heinrich IV Neumarkter (1380-1390)
 Heinrich V Braitenacher (1391-1406)
 Friedrich von Haindling (1406-1410)
 Michel (1410-1413)
 Peter I Grumad (1413-1419)
 Johann I Seetaler (1420-1424)
 Michael I Bogenhauser (1424-1442)
 Peter II Marschalk (1443-1446)
 Johann II Wenderer (1447-1464)
 Andreas I Müllich (1464-1476)
 Erasmus I Perfelder (1476-1495)
 Michael II Eckhart (1495-1518)
 Erasmus II Haunsperger (1518-1538)
 Matthias Diernhofer (1538-1545)
 Johann III Chrysostomus Hirschpeck (1545-1548)
 Gregor Labermayr (1548-1556)
 Wolfgang Hueber (1556-1570)
 Paulus Röhrl (1571-1573)
 Erasmus Hösl (1573-1580)
 Markus Besch (1580-1587)
 Paulus Klocker (1587-1602)
 Eustach Sturm (1602-1619)
 Georg Eiszepf (1619-1630)
 Andreas Pichler (1630-1631)
 Benedikt II Wolf (1631-1661)
 Roman Edstadler (1661-1665)
 Anton Schelshorn (1665-1695)
 Maurus I Kübeck (1695-1723)
 Korbinian Stange (1723-1732)
 Heinrich VI Widman (1732-1758)
 Heinrich VII Madlseder (1758-1779)
 Gregor Schwab (1779-1795)
 Augustin Stielner (1795-1801)
 Maurus II Deigl (1801-1803)

References

 Hemmerle, J.: Die Benediktinerklöster in Bayern (= Germania Benedictina, Bd.2), Ottobeuren 1970, pp. 137–141

External links
 Mallersdorf Abbey
 The Sisters of Mallersdorf
 College for social educational theory - Fachakademie für Sozialpädagogik
  Monasteries in Bavaria: Mallersdorf
 Pictures of the church and other churches in the region

Benedictine monasteries in Germany
Franciscan convents
Monasteries in Bavaria
1100s establishments in the Holy Roman Empire
1107 establishments in Europe
St. George's Abbey in the Black Forest
Straubing-Bogen